The Kita-Iwaki Powerline is the largest double-circuit powerline for three-phase electric power in the world. Built in 1999, it runs from Minami-Iwaki switch (Tamura, Fukushima) to Higashi-Yamanashi substation (Ōtsuki, Yamanashi) and has 2 circuits, which are operated at present with 500 kV, but can be switched over to 1100 kV if necessary equipment is installed. The conductors of the lines consist of 8*31.5 mm ACSR ropes providing for a total current capacity of 4000 amperes.
The line is supported by lattice towers with a typical height of 108 meters. These have three crossbars of spanning 31, 32 and 33 meters.

There are two such lines: the first one is 190 kilometers long and starts at Kashiwazaki-Kariwa Nuclear Power Plant and runs over Nishi-Gunma switch to Higashi-Yamanashi substation. It was built in 1993.
The second 240 kilometers long line, which was built in 1999 starts at Nishi-Gunma substation and runs over Higashi-Gunma substation to Minami-Iwaki switch, whereby it passes close to Shin-Imaichi switch, which is not connected to the line.

Sites

Sources
 http://old.life-needs-power.de/2008/24-04-2008_Donnerstag/24042008_16-30_LNP_Luxa_1100%20kV-V2%203.pdf#page=9

Electric power infrastructure in Japan
1999 establishments in Japan
High-voltage transmission lines
Energy infrastructure completed in 1999